Lach Gates at Independence Square in Kyiv is a monument built in 2001 to commemorate one of the Medieval Kyiv city gates. At the top is a sculpture of Archangel Michael which is the city's symbol.

The gates were located in the former city's Polish quarter on the southeast side of Kyiv. According to Primary Chronicle, in 1240 the Lach Gates became the main fortification where Batu Khan concentrated his assault during the 1240 siege of Kyiv.

Lach gates were one of three known gates of Medieval Kyiv (Old Kyiv), the others being the Golden Gate and the Jewish (Lviv) Gates.

History
The first mention of the gates is traced to 1151 during the confrontation between princes of Kyiv (Iziaslav II) and Suzdal (George the Long-Armed).

References

External links

 Monument "Lyadski vorota". Grand city Kyiv – historical portal.
 Lach Gates at the WEK encyclopedic Kyiv city portal

History of Kyiv
Gates in Ukraine
Maidan Nezalezhnosti
Monuments and memorials in Kyiv
Victory monuments